David Meza may refer to:

 David Meza (journalist) (1959–2010), Honduran journalist
 David Meza (footballer) (born 1988), Paraguayan footballer
 David José Meza (born 1987), Honduran footballer